St. Andrew's Episcopal School, also known as SAS, is a private school located in Austin, Texas, United States. St. Andrew's enrolls students in grades K-12 and is divided into three divisions: Lower (grades K-5), Middle (grades 6–8), and Upper (grades 9–12) Schools. The Lower and Middle Schools share a campus in central Austin, while the Upper School campus is in the southwestern part of the city.

History

St. Andrew's Episcopal School held its first classes in a house on Pearl Street in Austin Texas. The school commenced with its first school year during the fall of 1952, serving 32 students in grades 1–3. The school later moved to 31st Street, where the Lower and Middle Schools are now currently located. The school expanded to twelve grades in 1998 with the opening of a 73-acre Upper School campus on Southwest Parkway. In 2016, a kindergarten was established on the 31st Street campus, making St. Andrew's the only K-12 Episcopal School in Central Texas.

Academics
As part of the academic requirements for graduating Upper School, students must complete a "Junior Experience," described on the school website as "two weeks in a 'dramatically different environment,'" and a Senior Project, undertaken in May of the student's senior year. To satisfy the Junior Experience requirement, the school offers trips every summer to destinations including Spain, Italy, Nepal, Beijing, Romania, France, and New Mexico, though students may also submit independent proposals.

Since 2009, 21 percent of all St. Andrew's graduates were National Merit Commended Students and 32 percent were Advanced Placement Scholars. The average SAT scores of the Class of 2015 were 639 (Critical Reading), 637 (Mathematics), and 637 (Writing).

Fine arts
St. Andrew's offers a variety of performing opportunities at St. Andrew's, including choir, drama, and various musical ensembles. At the Upper School, Visual Arts, Music Theory, Jazz and Rock Bands, and Choir are offered as Fine Arts courses. The Choir has performed at Carnegie Hall in New York City, and the Select Choir has performed at the Washington National Cathedral in Washington, D.C. St. Andrew's was also the host of the 2013 ISAS Fine Arts Festival.

Athletics
St. Andrew's athletic teams compete in the Southwest Preparatory Conference (SPC). The Upper School fields teams in football, field hockey, cross country, volleyball, basketball, soccer, swimming and diving, softball, baseball, golf, track and field, tennis, and lacrosse. Middle School sports include basketball, cross country, field hockey, football, golf, lacrosse, soccer, tennis, track and field, and volleyball. Physical education is required in the Lower School.

The softball, lacrosse, and volleyball teams ended their 2010 season ranked #1 in SPC Division II.

Notable alumni
Barbara Pierce Bush and Jenna Bush Hager – Daughters of George W. Bush, attended Middle School
Benjamin McKenzie – actor, The O.C. and Southland, attended Lower School
Drew Brees – Super Bowl MVP, briefly attended Lower School, played part of one season of flag football before leaving.
Matt Belisle – Major League Baseball player
Mark Manson – #1 NYTimes Bestselling Author and blogger, attended Upper School
Max Frost – Singer and musician
Sam Selman – Major League Baseball player for the San Francisco Giants

References

External links

 St. Andrew's Episcopal School

Episcopal schools in the United States
Independent Schools Association of the Southwest
Private K-12 schools in Texas
Educational institutions established in 1952
Education in Austin, Texas
High schools in Travis County, Texas
High schools in Austin, Texas
1952 establishments in Texas